City of Shadows is a Canadian drama film, directed by Kim Nguyen and released in 2010. Partially inspired by but not a direct adaptation of Albert Camus's novel The Plague, the film stars Jean-Marc Barr as Maxime Vincent, a war doctor serving in North Africa who comes across a city dealing with an outbreak of bubonic plague.

The cast also includes Claude Legault, Pierre Lebeau, Sabine Karsenti, Lotfi Abdelli and Lotfi Dziri.

The film was shot in Tunisia in 2008, but commercial release was delayed until 2010 by financial problems at original distributor Christal Films.

It received five Jutra Award nominations at the 13th Jutra Awards, for Best Director (Nguyen), Best Cinematography (Nicolas Bolduc), Best Art Direction (Patrice Vermette), Best Costume Design (Mariane Carter) and Best Original Music (Philippe Héritier).

References

External links

2010 films
Canadian drama films
Films directed by Kim Nguyen
French-language Canadian films
2010s Canadian films